The 1995–96 Macedonian First League was the 4th season of the Macedonian First Football League, the highest football league of Macedonia. The first matches of the season were played on 20 August 1995 and the last on 9 June 1996. Vardar were the defending champions, having won their third title in a row. The 1995-96 champions were FK Sileks who had won their first title.

Promotion and relegation 

1 Pobeda Valandovo was initially promoted, but was expelled from the First League due to unknown reasons.

Participating teams

League table

Results

Top goalscorers

See also 
 1995–96 Macedonian Football Cup
 1995–96 Macedonian Second Football League

References

External links 
 Macedonia - List of final tables (RSSSF)
 Football Federation of Macedonia

Macedonia
1
Macedonian First Football League seasons